The Treaty of Tafna was signed by both Abd-el-Kader and General Thomas Robert Bugeaud on 30 May 1837. This agreement was developed after French imperial forces sustained heavy losses and military reversals in Algeria. The terms of the treaty entailed Abd-el-Kader recognizing French imperial sovereignty in Africa. However, the price France had to pay for acquiring recognition entailed its secession of approximately two thirds of Algeria to Abd-el-Kader (the provinces of Oran, Koléa, Médéa, Tlemcen and Algiers). As a result of the treaty, France was able to maintain only a few ports. 

The stipulations of the treaty indicated that the French interpreted the territory of Emir Abdelkader as sovereign, thereby recognising an Algerian state. Abd-el-Kader used the treaty to consolidate his power over tribes throughout the interior, establishing new cities far from French control. He worked to motivate the population under French control to resist by peaceful and military means. Seeking to face the French against , he laid claim under the treaty to territory that included the main route between Algiers and Constantine. When French troops contested the claim in late 1839 by marching through a mountain defile known as the Iron Gates, he claimed a breach of the treaty and renewed calls for jihad.

See also
French rule in Algeria
List of treaties
Emir Abdelkader
Emir Mustapha

References

Sources
An Account of Algeria, or the French Provinces in Africa. Journal of the Statistical Society of London, Vol. 2, No. 2, pp. 115 – 126 (March 1839).

External links
Chronology: The July Monarchy (1830 - 1848)
The Encyclopedia of World History (2001)
Armed Conflict Events Database: Second Jihad of Abd al Qadir 1835 - 1837

Tafna
1837 in France
1837 treaties
Tafna
French Algeria
1837 in Algeria
Algeria–France relations